Bardwad is a village in Dharwad district of Karnataka, India.

Demographics
As of the 2011 Census of India, there were 485 households in Bardwad and a total population of 2,299 consisting of 1,170 males and 1,129 females. There were 253 children ages 0-6.

References

Villages in Dharwad district